

283001–283100 

|-id=057
| 283057 Casteldipiazza ||  || Castel di Piazza, a historic Italian village in northern Tuscany, near Florence, and home of co-discoverer Giancarlo Fagioli || 
|}

283101–283200 

|-id=141
| 283141 Dittsche ||  || Olli Dittrich (born 1956), known as "Dittsche", is a German actor, comedian and musician. || 
|-id=142
| 283142 Weena ||  || Weena, a fictional character in H. G. Wells sci-fi novel The Time Machine || 
|}

283201–283300 

|-id=277
| 283277 Faber ||  || Sandra Moore Faber (born 1944), an astronomer at University of California at Santa Cruz || 
|-id=279
| 283279 Qianweichang ||  || Qian Weichang (1912–2010), an academician of Chinese Academy of Sciences, was the founder of mechanics in China. He discovered the Qian Weichang equation and systematically developed the theory of large deflection of circular thin plates. || 
|}

283301–283400 

|-bgcolor=#f2f2f2
| colspan=4 align=center | 
|}

283401–283500 

|-id=455
| 283455 Philipkrider ||  || E. Philip Krider (born 1940) made fundamental contributions to understanding physical processes producing atmospheric electrical discharges while at the University of Arizona. He chaired a panel providing recommendations to prevent lightning strikes such as those hitting the Apollo 12 launch. He is also an expert on the life and science of Benjamin Franklin. || 
|-id=461
| 283461 Leacipaola ||  || Paola Leaci (born 1980), a researcher at the Physics Department of the Sapienza University of Rome || 
|}

283501–283600 

|-bgcolor=#f2f2f2
| colspan=4 align=center | 
|}

283601–283700 

|-bgcolor=#f2f2f2
| colspan=4 align=center | 
|}

283701–283800 

|-id=786
| 283786 Rutebeuf ||  || Rutebeuf (1245–1285), a French poet || 
|}

283801–283900 

|-bgcolor=#f2f2f2
| colspan=4 align=center | 
|}

283901–284000 

|-id=990
| 283990 Randallrosenfeld ||  || Randall Rosenfeld (born 1959), the national archivist of the Royal Astronomical Society of Canada || 
|}

References 

283001-284000